Patrick John "PJ" Tierro (born August 1, 1985) is an American-born Filipino former professional tennis player.

Tierro, who was born in South Carolina, began his Davis Cup career in 2004 and featured in a total of 19 ties, across two stints in the team. In 2009 he stepped away from the side while he undertook his studies at De La Salle University but returned after graduating and played until 2017. He won nine singles and four doubles rubbers for his country.

A two-time Asian Games representative, Tierro was a Southeast Asian Games gold medalist for the Philippines in both 2005 and 2009, as a competitor in the team event.

References

External links
 
 
 

1985 births
Living people
Filipino male tennis players
Filipino people of American descent
Tennis people from South Carolina
Tennis players at the 2006 Asian Games
Tennis players at the 2014 Asian Games
Asian Games competitors for the Philippines
Southeast Asian Games gold medalists for the Philippines
Southeast Asian Games bronze medalists for the Philippines
Southeast Asian Games medalists in tennis
Competitors at the 2005 Southeast Asian Games
Competitors at the 2007 Southeast Asian Games
Competitors at the 2009 Southeast Asian Games